Onslow was a New Zealand parliamentary electorate, from 1946 to 1963, and then from 1993 to 1996 in the Wellington area. It was represented by three Members of Parliament.

Population centres
The 1941 New Zealand census had been postponed due to World War II, so the 1946 electoral redistribution had to take ten years of population growth and movements into account. The North Island gained a further two electorates from the South Island due to faster population growth. The abolition of the country quota through the Electoral Amendment Act, 1945 reduced the number and increased the size of rural electorates. None of the existing electorates remained unchanged, 27 electorates were abolished, eight former electorates were re-established, and 19 electorates were created for the first time, including Onslow.

The electorate covered the northern suburbs of the city of Wellington, i.e. Ngaio, Khandallah and Johnsonville. The name Onslow comes from the former Borough of Onslow which covered Wadestown until April 1907 its south ward and its most populous area and the remaining Khandallah Ngaio areas until they too joined Wellington City in 1919.

History
The electorate was established for the 1946 election.

The unsuccessful National candidate  in 1954 was Wilfred Fortune, who had represented  in Auckland from 1946 to 1954.

The electorate lasted until the 1963 election, when the Karori electorate was established.

The electorate was re-established in the 1993 election to replace Ohariu. Peter Dunne, who had previously represented the Ohariu electorate, was the successful candidate. For the first MMP election, the 1996 election, it was renamed back to Ohariu-Belmont, and included Belmont in the Hutt Valley.

Members of Parliament
The Onslow electorate was represented by three Members of Parliament.

Key

Election results

1993 election

1960 election

1957 election

1954 election

1954 by-election

1951 election

1949 election

1946 election

Notes

References

Historical electorates of New Zealand
Politics of the Wellington Region
1946 establishments in New Zealand
1963 disestablishments in New Zealand
1996 disestablishments in New Zealand
1993 establishments in New Zealand